BLOC-3 or biogenesis of lysosome-related organelles complex 3 is a ubiquitously expressed multisubunit protein complex.

Interactions
biogenesis of lysosome-related organelles complex 3 has been shown to interact with Rab9A.

Complex Components
The identified protein subunits of BLOC-1 include:

 HPS1, 
 HPS4

References

Cell biology